The Neoplan Megaliner was a quad-axle double-decker luxury coach built by the German coach manufacturer Neoplan Bus GmbH between 1983 and 2000.

See also 

 List of buses

External links
Omnibus Archiv Megaliner - Megaspace - Megashuttle – images and description 

Megaliner
Buses of Germany
Double-decker buses
Coaches (bus)
Vehicles introduced in 1983